Ashoa is a small village in Kawkhali Upazila of Pirojpur District in Bangladesh. The Gabkhan Channel starts from beside this village.

References

Pirojpur District